Guy Lee Thys (born 20 October 1952) is a Belgian film producer, director, and screenwriter.

In 1981 Guy Lee Thys, whose nickname in the Belgian media is "enfant terrible of Flemish Cinema", established Skyline Films, renamed Fact & Fiction in 1992. The small production company produces moderate budget feature-length fiction and documentaries. Fact & Fiction is headquartered in Antwerp, Belgium.

Works
 The Pencil Murders (aka De Potloodmoorden, 1982)
 Cruel Horizon (aka Boat People, 1989)
 Shades, as screenwriter and associate producer, starring Mickey Rourke, directed by Eric Van Looy (1999)
 Kassablanka (2002), a Romeo and Juliet story set in an Antwerp working class district where Muslims and white supremacists clash
 Suspect, emo-drama on phony incest victims, released in 2005
 The Box Collector (2008), as story writer and associate producer, directed by John Daly, shot in Winnipeg, Manitoba, Canada summer of 2007.
 Mixed Kebab (2012), the story about the gay relationship between a Turkish and Flemish guy.

References
 
 
 tuinkabouters.com

External links
 Personal website

1952 births
Living people
Belgian film directors